Joan of Arc (Jeanne d'Arc in French) has inspired artistic and cultural works for nearly six centuries. The following lists cover various media to include items of historic interest, enduring works of high art, and recent representations in popular culture.  The entries represent portrayals that a reader has a reasonable chance of encountering rather than a complete catalog.  Lesser known works, particularly from early periods, are not included.
In this article, many of the excluded items are derivative of better known representations.  For instance, Friedrich Schiller's 1801 play The Maid of Orleans inspired at least 82 different dramatic works during the nineteenth century, and Verdi's and Tchaikovsky's operatic adaptations are still recorded and performed.  Most of the others survive only in research libraries.  As another example, in 1894, Émile Huet listed over 400 plays and musical works about Joan of Arc. Despite a great deal of scholarly interest in Joan of Arc, no complete list of artistic works about her exists, although a 1989 doctoral dissertation did identify all relevant films including ones for which no copy survives.

Portrayals of Joan of Arc are numerous. For example, in 1979 the Bibliothèque Municipale in Rouen, France displayed a gallery containing over 500 images and other items related to Joan of Arc.
The story of Joan of Arc was a popular subject for dramatization in the 1940s.  In addition to Maxwell Anderson's play Joan of Lorraine and the Ingrid Bergman film Joan of Arc, there was also the 1948 RKO film The Miracle of the Bells starring Fred MacMurray, Alida Valli, and Frank Sinatra, about a dying film actress whose first and last role is Joan of Arc. There were also three radio dramatizations of the story of Joan during those years, one of them specifically written with a World War II framework.

Literature and theatre

Operas, oratorios, and vocal works

Images

Sculpture

Film

In popular culture

Advertising
Benetton's 1988 "United Superstars of Benetton" print and billboard campaign featured two models as Joan and as Marilyn Monroe
Whoopi Goldberg played Joan in a 2010 commercial for Kimberly-Clark's Poise

Culinary
 B&G Foods's "Joan of Arc", a Canadian brand on tinned beans.

Film
British Agent: Locke tells Elena that she is his Joan of Arc.
How to Build a Girl: Joan is among the literary and historical figures in Johanna's collage.
Meet John Doe: Charlie tells Ann that John "thinks that you're Joan of Arc or something".
Mystery of the Wax Museum: Igor turns one of his victims into a statue of Joan.
Stand-In: As Dodd sets out to save the studio, Quintain says to him: "Carry on, Joan of Arc".
Twentieth Century: Jaffe stages the play Joan of Arc, which closes on opening night.

Finance
 Jeanne D'Arc Credit Union (Lowell, Massachusetts).

Music

Television

Video games

Comics and animation

In philately

Other representations
Joan of Arc's short haircut had a profound effect on women's hairstyles in the twentieth century.  In 1909, the Paris hairdresser Antoine took Joan of Arc as the inspiration for the bob, which ended centuries of taboo against women who cut their hair.  The style became popular in the 1920s and was associated with liberated women.  Nearly all subsequent Western hair fashions are designed for women who cut their hair at least occasionally. Such haircut is still known in French as coupe à la Jeanne d'Arc (Joan of Arc's haircut).

During the Cristero War in 1927, a group of female Cristeros named themselves after Joan of Arc.  They obtained money, supplies, and intelligence for the male combatants.  They often smuggled weapons into war zones and cared for the wounded.  By the end of the war they had 35,000 participants.

Several people have been seen as modern versions of Joan of Arc:
Malalai of Maiwand, called the "Afghan Joan of Arc"
Tringe Smajl Martini,  referred to as "The Albanian Joan of Arc"
Lalla Fatma N'Soumer, referred to as "The Joan of Arc of Kabylie" 
Ani Pachen, referred to as "The Tibetan Joan of Arc"
Sarah Taylor, referred to as "The Tennessee Joan of Arc"
Triệu Thị Trinh, referred to as "The Vietnamese Joan of Arc"
Emilia Plater, referred to as "The Polish Joan of Arc"

See also

History of film
Middle Ages in film

Notes
 Pernoud 1999, p. 243.
 Pernoud 1999, p. 239.
 Pernoud 1999, pp. 240, 246.

References

Nadia Margolis, Joan of Arc in History, Literature, and Film (New York: Garland, 1990).
Régine Pernoud and Marie-Véronique Clin, Joan of Arc: Her Story, trans. Jeremy Duquesnay Adams (New York: St. Martin's Griffin, 1999).

External links

International Joan of Arc Society film list
Médailles Jeanne d'Arc. French site containing pictures and descriptions of Medallions devoted to Joan of Arc.

 
Dynamic lists
French art
Iconography
Joan Of Arc